The Massachusetts Library System was established in 2010. The system provides the following core services: consulting, training & professional development, cooperative purchasing, research & development, summer library program, and the following services as part of resource sharing: delivery, mediated interlibrary loan, journal article document delivery, MassCat, and electronic content, including statewide databases and eBooks (Commonwealth eBook Collections) in collaboration with the Massachusetts Board of Library Commissioners."  It operates from offices in Marlborough and Northampton, Massachusetts.

The entity was formed "to consolidate the services of six former regional library systems:" Boston Regional Library System, Central Massachusetts Regional Library System, MetroWest Regional Library System, Northeast Massachusetts Regional Library System, Southeastern Massachusetts Library System, and Western Massachusetts Regional Library System. 

During its formation by the Massachusetts legislature in spring 2010, the state-wide system received mixed support. The Massachusetts Library Association, for example, opposed aspects of the consolidation of regional systems, claiming service would suffer.

According to its website, the Massachusetts Library System's "services are provided through state funds administered by the Massachusetts Board of Library Commissioners," a state agency.  The executive board consists of representatives from public libraries, public and private schools and colleges, and libraries of private organizations.

References

Further reading
 Update on new Massachusetts Library System. Brandeis University Library, Research & Instruction Services blog, March 3, 2010
 David Riley. Massachusetts library systems to be consolidated, staff cut. MetroWest Daily News (Framingham MA), Apr 26, 2010.
 Dan Ring. Western Massachusetts Regional Library System faces state funding cuts, layoffs. Masslive.com, May 6, 2010
 MLA does not support "The Western Region Amendment." MetroWest blog, 10 May 2010
 Maureen Turner. Fighting for Western Mass. Libraries: the state Senate takes up the cause of the region's libraries. Valley Advocate (Northampton MA), June 3, 2010

External links
 http://www.masslibsystem.org/

2010 establishments in Massachusetts
Library consortia in Massachusetts